Oruj Qeshlaq may refer to:
Oruj Qeshlaq-e Hajj Almas Khan
Oruj Qeshlaq-e Hajj Esmail
Oruj Qeshlaq-e Hajj Omran
Oruj Qeshlaq-e Morad